Minnesota Junction is an unincorporated community located, in the town of Oak Grove, in Dodge County, Wisconsin, United States. Minnesota Junction is located on Wisconsin Highway 26. It is located at latitude 43.452 and longitude -88.697 at 925 feet above mean sea level.

History
Minnesota Junction was founded when the railroad was built to that point. The community was so named from the expectation the new railroad line would eventually extend from Minnesota Junction to the Minnesota Territory. A post office was established in Minnesota Junction in 1861, and remained in operation until it was discontinued in 1940. The junction was situation where a north–south branch of the Chicago and North Western Railway met an east–west branch of the Milwaukee Road. The north–south line was abandoned in 1984, and is now a rail trail, while the east–west line is still operated by the Wisconsin and Southern Railroad.

References

Unincorporated communities in Dodge County, Wisconsin
Unincorporated communities in Wisconsin
1861 establishments in Wisconsin
Former Chicago, Milwaukee, St. Paul and Pacific Railroad stations
Former Chicago and North Western Railway stations